Chen Jia-Shang (Chinese: 陳嘉尚 - pinyin: Chén Jiashang)  (March 1909 - March 6, 1972) was a colonel general of the Republic of China Air Force and the Third Commander in Chief of the ROCAF whose term spanned July 1, 1957 to July 1, 1963. He was born in Hangzhou in the Zhejiang Province in March 1909.

Biography 
Chen is a graduate of the 6th Term of National Military Academy, the class of the 1st Term of the National Aviation Academy, and assumed the position as the Commander-in-Chief of the Republic of China Air Force on July 1, 1957, and served until July 1, 1963.

In 1928, Chen was admitted to the ROC Army Officer School and selected as a student in the aviating training class in 1929. After graduating in 1931, he enrolled at the Italian Air Force Academy to study. After returning to China in 1932, he served as a second and third flight instructor at the Central Aviation School.

In 1949, Chen went to Taiwan to construct an air base and served as the Deputy Commander of the Air Defense Command, the Deputy Commander-in-Chief of the ROC Air Force Headquarters and the Commander of the Combat Command. In 1957, specifically on July 1, 1957, he served as Commander-in-Chief of the ROC Air Force and was promoted to second-level General of the ROC Air Force the following year in 1958.

Chen fought in the Battle of the Central Plains while as a cadet of the National Aviation Academy in 1930, and also in the Battle of Shanghai, the battles with the Red Army in Fujian and Jiangxi, and various battles in the War of Resistance Against Japanese Aggression during World War II. In these battles, General Chen drove the fighter planes by himself or with his co-pilot and First Officer Chin Hsieh. Chen also led the ROCAF in many battles of the Chinese Civil War. In the battle that took place over the Taiwan Straits on August 23, 1958, Chen won over the Red Army with a record of 31:1.

In the 1960s, Chen served successively as a member of the 8th, 9th, and 10th Central Committee of the Kuomintang. Chen succeeded his teacher and mentor, Wang Shuming as Chief Staff of the Ministry of National Defense. Chen also served as Ambassador to Jordan from 1967 until May 1972, when he was also replaced by his former teacher Wang Shuming. On March 6, 1972, Chen died of illness.

Accolades 
The Cauldron Medal
The Sky Command Medal
The Loyalty and Service Award
The Celestial Kindness Medal
The Recovery Medal
The Victory Medal
The Land, Sea and Air Award
The Model Award
The Literate Award
The Victory in War of Resistance Award
The US Commander Achievement Award
The Crown Medal of Thailand
The Grand Cross of Spain Medal
The Star of Jordan Medal
The Grand Cross of Peru Medal
The National Emblem of Jordan Medal

See also 
 Wang Shuming - Chen's teacher and mentor
 Tang Duo (General) (Zh-Wiki), another early combat aviator from China who studied in the Soviet Union, and fmr. classmates with Wang Shuming at the Whampoa Military Academy.
 陳嘉尚 (Zh-Wiki), Chen Jia-shang's entry on Chinese Wikipedia

References 

1909 births

1972 deaths
Members of the Kuomintang
Chinese aviators
Chinese people of World War II
Ambassadors of China to Jordan
People from Hangzhou
Taiwanese people from Zhejiang